Sewadjkare Hori (also known as Hori II)  was a pharaoh of the late 13th Dynasty, possibly the thirty-sixth king of this dynasty. He reigned over Middle and Upper Egypt for five years, either during the early or mid-17th century, from 1669 until 1664 BC or from 1648 until 1643 BC.

Attestation 
Sewadjkare Hori is only known for certain from the Turin canon, row 8, column 7 (Gardiner, von Beckerath: row 7, column 7). The Turin canon provides the prenomen Sewadjkare and the nomen Hori for this king. Jürgen von Beckerath assigns to him a stone fragment from El-Tod inscribed with the prenomen "Sewadj[...]re". However, since there are two other rulers from the Second Intermediate Period bearing the same prenomen, this identification remains conjectural.

Identity
Sewadjkare Hori should not be confused with Sewadjkare, a pharaoh of the early 13th Dynasty, and with another Sewadjkare III from the mid 14th Dynasty. Both of these pharaohs enjoyed shorter reigns than Sewadjkare Hori.

References

17th-century BC Pharaohs
Pharaohs of the Thirteenth Dynasty of Egypt